Aydarovo is a rural locality (a selo) and the administrative center of Aydarovskoye Rural Settlement, Ramonsky District, Voronezh Oblast, Russia. The population was 939 as of 2010. There are 27 streets.

Geography 
Aydarovo is located 4 km west of Ramon (the district's administrative centre) by road. VNISS is the nearest rural locality.

References 

Rural localities in Ramonsky District